Pehk is an Estonian surname. Notable people with the surname include:

Erki Pehk (born 1968), Estonian conductor
Heino Pehk (born 1940), Estonian choir conductor
Jaan Pehk (born 1975), Estonian writer and singer

Estonian-language surnames